Eupithecia tarfata is a moth in the family Geometridae. It is found in Algeria.

References

Moths described in 1907
tarfata
Moths of Africa